Kalckhoff may refer to:

 Kalckhoff Medal, a German literary prize
 Andreas Kalckhoff (born 1944), German historian and writer
 Franz Kalckhoff (1860–1955), German philatelist